Fiery Summer is a 1939 Czech drama film directed by František Čáp and Václav Krška based on a novel by Krška.

Production
The film was shot around Bechyně. The chateau scenes were shot at Konopiště and Smetanova Lhota.

Cast
Václav Sova as Julio
Lída Baarová as Rosa
Svatopluk Beneš as Šimon
Zorka Janů as Red Klárka
Otylie Beníšková as Julio's Aunt
Antonie Nedošinská as Paulina
Josef Stadler as Petr
Jaroslav Liška as Střevlík
František Roland as Ferryman
Jan W. Speerger as Railway worker
Bohdan Lachman as Butler

References

External links 
 

Czechoslovak drama films
Czech drama films
1939 drama films
1939 films
1930s Czech-language films
Films directed by František Čáp
Films directed by Václav Krška
Czech black-and-white films
Films based on Czech novels
1930s Czech films